Proper Games Limited was a British video game developer based in Dundee. Paddy Sinclair founded Proper Games in early 2006 after the closure of his previous employer, Visual Science. In March 2011, the company underwent restructuring, which included several layoffs, and several more employees left the company that September. Proper Games filed for insolvency in January 2020, which culminated in its liquidation in July 2021.

Games developed

References 

2006 establishments in Scotland
2021 disestablishments in Scotland
British companies disestablished in 2021
British companies established in 2006
Companies based in Dundee
Defunct video game companies of the United Kingdom
Video game development companies